Quebec (AG) v Blaikie (No 1), [1979] 2 S.C.R. 1016 is a leading decision of the Supreme Court of Canada on language rights in the Constitution Act, 1867. The Court held that the sections of Quebec's Charter of the French Language (better-known at the time as "Bill 101"), which required that provincial laws be enacted in French only, violated section 133 of the Constitution Act, 1867.

Section 133 reads as follows:

The Court found that these requirements apply to all legislation and regulations. On this basis, it found the restrictions placed upon English in Chapter III of Title I of the Charter of the French Language to be ultra vires the Legislative Assembly of Quebec.

The interpretation given by the Court to language rights was expansive in four respects:

1.	Both the English and French versions of a law have official status, or else the law cannot be said to have been “enacted” in both language;

2.	All subordinate legislation, including regulations, are regarded as being “laws”, and thus the versions in both languages have official status;

3.	The rights of all persons to use either official language in court applies to artificial persons such as corporations;

4.	“Courts of Quebec” was interpreted to include administrative tribunals and panels, in addition to ordinary courts.

Chapter III of Title I of the Charter of the French Language, entitled "The Language of the Legislature and of the Courts", reads as follows:

The Court provided the following explanation for finding the restrictions on English in these provisions to be unconstitutional:

Aftermath
Upon receiving the judgment the government of Quebec applied for a rehearing in order to get clarification on whether there were any exemptions from section 133. The policy purpose of the application was to allow the provincial government to restrict the scope of English-language services as much as possible, without violating section 133. Two years later the Court handed down its decision in Quebec (Attorney General) v. Blaikie (No. 2) (1981), clarifying that municipal governments, which are creatures of the provincial government, are nonetheless not constitutionally obliged to conduct their proceedings or to produce bylaws in both languages.

See also
 List of Supreme Court of Canada cases (Laskin Court)

External links

Canadian constitutional case law
Supreme Court of Canada cases
1979 in Canadian case law
Quebec language policy